Everline Kemunto Kimwei (born 25 August 1987) is a Kenyan long-distance runner. Her greatest achievement was a team gold medal at the 2007 IAAF World Road Running Championships, where she was sixth. She is joint-holder of the African record for the ekiden marathon relay, courtesy of her winning run for Kenya at the 2006 Chiba Ekiden.

Kimwei won a team silver medal as a junior at the 2004 IAAF World Cross Country Championships. She holds the world junior bests for the 15K and 20K distances, with times of 47:39 minutes and 65:04 minutes, respectively. Both these marks were achieved at the 2006 Kobe Women's Half Marathon, which she won. Kimwei was based in Japan for much of her teenage life and was highly successful there. She won the Matsue 10K and Sanyo Women's Half Marathon in both 2005 and 2007. She also had top three finishes at the Nobeoka Golden Games, Shizuoka International, Hyogo Relays and Sapporo Half Marathon. She was the 2007 Japanese Corporate champion over 10K.

Her brief marathon running career began at the 2008 Mumbai Marathon, where she recorded a lifetime best of 2:32:51 hours. She followed this with a run at the 2008 London Marathon, where she failed to finish. She won the Colombo Marathon later that year and made her final appearance at the Istanbul Marathon, finishing well out of contention in 3:20:05 hours.

International competitions

Personal bests
3000 metres – 9:06.84 min (2007)
5000 metres – 15:14.15 min (2005)
10,000 metres – 31:16.50 min (2006)
10K run – 31:18 min (2007)
Half marathon – 68:39 min (2007)
Marathon – 2:32:51 (2008)

References

External links

Living people
1987 births
Kenyan female long-distance runners
Kenyan female marathon runners
Kenyan female cross country runners
21st-century Kenyan women